Kueichowlepis is an extinct genus of placoderm fish, which lived during the Devonian period of East Asia.

References

Placoderms of Asia
Phlyctaeniidae